Roberto Vieri (born 14 February 1946) is an Italian retired professional footballer who played as a striker, and also as a central attacking midfielder or winger. Active in both Italy and Australia, Vieri made nearly 300 professional career league appearances, scoring over 50 goals. He also represented Italy at under-23 level, scoring a goal in five appearances.

Personal life
Vieri was born in Prato. His sons Christian and Max are also professional footballers, who both appeared at the international level respectively for Italy and Australia.

Career
Vieri started playing in the Fiorentina youth system before being loaned to Prato during the 1964–65 season, where he scored 11 goals in 24 matches and caused interest by Sampdoria of Serie B. He played for Sampdoria, both in Serie B and Serie A, until the 1969–70 season, when Juventus signed him for a then-significant 800 million ITL bid, plus Francesco Morini and Romeo Benetti. The next year, Vieri moved to A.S. Roma. During the 1973–74 season, he played for Bologna, where he won the Coppa Italia during his first year with the team; he remained with the club until January 1977, when he decided to accept an offer by Australian football club Marconi Stallions, becoming one of the first Italian footballers to play abroad. He played with the Australian club until 1982, except for a one-year stint back at Prato. In 1983, he moved to Queanbeyan (New South Wales) where he became the player/coach of NSW State League club Inter Monaro for one year. In 1984, he returned to Sydney as part of the Marconi Stallions coaching staff. In 1996 Vieri moved back to Italy and relocated in Tuscany with his wife.

Honours
Fiorentina
Coppa Italia: 1965–66
Mitropa Cup: 1966
	 
Bologna
Coppa Italia: 1973–74

Roma
Anglo-Italian Cup: 1972

References

Living people
1946 births
Italian footballers
Italian emigrants to Australia
People from Prato
U.C. Sampdoria players
Juventus F.C. players
A.S. Roma players
Bologna F.C. 1909 players
Italian expatriate footballers
Italian expatriate sportspeople in Australia
Serie A players
ACF Fiorentina players
Marconi Stallions FC players
A.C. Prato players
Toronto Blizzard (1971–1984) players
North American Soccer League (1968–1984) players
Expatriate soccer players in Canada
Expatriate soccer players in Australia
Association football forwards
Sportspeople from the Province of Prato
Footballers from Tuscany